Acacia richardsii is a shrub belonging to the genus Acacia and the subgenus Juliflorae that is endemic to north western Australia.

Description
It has glabrous and resin-ribbed branchlets that are angled towards the apices. Like most species of Acacia it has phyllodes rather than true leaves. The phyllodes are quite thin, obtuse and subglaucous and usually have two nerves per face with many barely noticeable minor nerves. It blooms from March to August producing yellow flowers. Following flowering woody, red-brown seed pods form that have a narrowly oblong to linear shape and are narrowed at the base.

Distribution
It is native to a small area in the Kimberley region of Western Australia where it is situated on hills, creek beds and in rocky areas where it is found growing in sandstone based soils. It has a limited range from around Kununurra extending eastwards into the top end of the Northern Territory as far as the Keep River National Park.

See also
List of Acacia species

References

richardsii
Acacias of Western Australia
Plants described in 1983
Taxa named by Bruce Maslin
Flora of the Northern Territory